There have been 97 women in the Legislative Assembly of Queensland since its establishment in 1860. Women have had the right to vote in the Assembly since 1905 and the right to stand as candidates since 1915.

The first successful female candidate for the Legislative Assembly was Irene Longman, who was elected as the member for Bulimba in 1929 representing the Country and Progressive National Party. She was defeated in 1932, and women were not represented again until 1966, when Labor's Vi Jordan won the seat of Ipswich West. Although Jordan was defeated in 1974, that year also saw two more women, Vicky Kippin of the National Party and Rosemary Kyburz of the Liberal Party, enter parliament.

1989 was considered a breakthrough year for women in the Queensland Parliament, as previously only 11 women had sat in the parliament. The first female minister was Yvonne Chapman in 1986. In 1991, Joan Sheldon became the first woman to lead a Party, and in 1996, she became the first woman Treasurer. In 2012, Fiona Simpson became the first woman Speaker. The first non-major party woman, independent Liz Cunningham, was elected as the member for Gladstone in 1995. Since then, four other women, Dorothy Pratt, Rosa Lee Long, Elisa Roberts, and Sandy Bolton have won seats for non-major parties or as independents. Pratt, Lee Long and Roberts were originally elected for One Nation, although Pratt and Roberts subsequently retained their seats as independents. Only two Indigenous Australian women, Leeanne Enoch (2015) and Cynthia Lui (2017), have been elected to the Queensland parliament.

Anna Bligh was the first woman to become Premier, succeeding Peter Beattie in 2007. In 2009 she became the first woman in Australia to win an election as Premier. In 2015, the two highest ministers in the Queensland government were both women with Annastacia Palaszczuk as Premier and Jackie Trad as Deputy Premier, the second in Australian political history. Palaszczuk was also the first woman to lead an opposition into government. The Palaszczuk Ministry was the first female dominated government in Australian history with 8 out of the 14 ministers being women.

Although women have been Members of the Queensland Legislative Assembly since 1966, they are still under-represented as a proportion compared to men. In 2001, Queensland held the record for the proportion of women in the parliament with 33 out of 89 members (37%)  being women. Since then the proportion of women have fallen. There were 25 women out of 89 members (28%) in the 2015 Queensland Parliament.

List of women in the Queensland Legislative Assembly

Names in bold indicate women who have been appointed as Ministers and Parliamentary Secretaries during their time in Parliament. Names in italics indicate women who were first elected at a by-election.

Timeline

Proportion of women in the Assembly
Numbers and proportions are as they were directly after the relevant election and do not take into account by-elections, defections or other changes in membership. The Liberal column also includes that party's predecessors, the Country and Progressive National, United Australia and People's parties, as well as the successor of both the Liberal and National parties, the Liberal National Party.

See also
Women and government in Australia

References 

 
Queensland